Andrew Robert Laws (born 21 September 1991) is an English former first-class cricketer.

Laws was born at Reigate in September 1991. He was educated at The Leys School, before going up to Leeds Metropolitan University. While studying at Leeds Metropolitan, he made two appearances in first-class cricket for Leeds/Bradford MCCU against Yorkshire and Somerset in 2014. In addition to playing first-class cricket, he also played minor counties cricket for Cambridgeshire in from 2009 to 2018, making three appearances in the Minor Counties Championship and five appearances in the MCCA Knockout Trophy.

References

External links

1991 births
Living people
People from Reigate
People educated at The Leys School
Alumni of Leeds Beckett University
English cricketers
Cambridgeshire cricketers
Leeds/Bradford MCCU cricketers